Nazmakan-e Sofla (also Romanized as Nāzmakān-e Soflá; also known as Nāzmakān and Nāzmakān-e Pā’īn) is a village in Boyer Ahmad-e Garmsiri Rural District, in the Central District of Gachsaran County, Kohgiluyeh and Boyer-Ahmad Province, Iran. At the 2006 census, its population was 157, in 31 families.

References 

Populated places in Gachsaran County